The Drum Major General was a royal appointment in the British Army used from the mid-17th century and into the 18th century. Under this appointment, all training and licensing of military drummers took place.

List of Drum Major Generals 
The following individuals held the appointment of Drum Major General, with date of appointment:
20 June 1660 – J. Maugridge
10 April 1688 – J. Maugridge
24 April 1705 – R. Maugridge Jr.
18 February 1720 – J. Clothier
4 February 1754 – J. Conquest
C.1762 – L. Higgins
1766 – H. Moore
4 January 1777 – C. Stuart
6 February 1791 – Wm. Hood

See also 
 Drum major
 Corps of drums
 Royal Corps of Army Music

References 

Military appointments of the British Army